All This Way is the first studio album by Swedish singer and winner of eight series of Swedish Idol Amanda Fondell. The album features the single "All This Way". It was released in Sweden on 19 December 2011. The album entered the Swedish Albums Chart at number #6 and reached #1 its second week.

Singles
 "All This Way" was released as the album's lead single on 5 December 2011. The song peaked to number 1 on the Swedish Singles Chart.

Track listing

Charts

Weekly charts

Year-end charts

Release history

References

2011 debut albums
Amanda Fondell albums
Universal Records albums